Butlin is a surname that may refer to:

Barry Butlin (born 1949), English footballer
Sir Billy Butlin (1899–1980), British entrepreneur, founder of the Butlin's chain of holiday camps
Sir Henry Butlin, 1st Baronet (1845–1912), British surgeon
Martin Butlin (born 1929), British art historian
Noel Butlin (1921-1991), Australian economic historian
Paul Butlin (born 1976), English heavyweight boxer
Robin Butlin, British professor of geography
Ron Butlin (born 1949), Scottish poet and novelist
Ron Butlin (ice hockey) (1925–2014), Canadian ice hockey executive